Foust is a surname. Notable people with the name include:

Foust (artist), American printmaker and writer
Cleon H. Foust (1907-2003), American politician
Graham Foust (born 1970), American poet and professor
Jeff Foust, aerospace analyst, journalist and publisher
John Foust (born 1949), member of the Fairfax County, Virginia Board of Supervisors
Larry Foust (1928–1984), American basketball player
Tanner Foust, professional racing driver, stunt driver, and television host
Tim Foust, (born 1981), American vocalist and music arranger

See also
Warren Ashby Residential College at Mary Foust
Faust (disambiguation), includes list of people with name Faust
Fouts